Neriya  is a village in the southern state of Karnataka, India. It is located in the Beltangadi taluk of Dakshina Kannada district in Karnataka.

Demographics
 India census, Neriya had a population of 6191 with 3127 males and 3064 females.                 Region.

Environmental issues
The forests around Neriya village were thought to have been affected due to the Mangalore - Bangalore Pipeline (MBPL) and were in news during the late 1990s and early 2000s.

See also
 Dakshina Kannada
 Districts of Karnataka

References

External links
 http://dk.nic.in/

Villages in Dakshina Kannada district